Jacobus de Cessolis (c. 1250 – c. 1322) was an Italian author of the most famous morality book on chess in the Middle Ages.

In the second half of the 13th century, Jacobus de Cessolis, a Dominican friar in Cessole (Asti district, Piemonte, Northern Italy) used chess as the basis for a series of sermons on morality. They later became Liber de moribus hominum et officiis nobilium super ludo scacchorum ('Book of the customs of men and the duties of nobles or the Book of Chess'). The popular work was translated into many other languages and was first printed in Utrecht in 1473. Chess historian Harold Murray asserts that the popularity of the work rivaled "that of the Bible itself." The work was the basis for William Caxton's The Game and Playe of the Chesse (1474), one of the first books printed in English.

References

Further reading

 Oliver Plessow: Mittelalterliche Schachzabelbücher zwischen Spielsymbolik und Wertevermittlung – Der Schachtraktat des Jacobus de Cessolis im Kontext seiner spätmittelalterlichen Rezeption. Rhema-Verlag, Münster 2007,

External links
 
 
A book of the chesse moralysed From the Rare Book and Special Collections Division at the Library of Congress
De ludo scachorum. Augsburg, Günther Zainer 1477. Rare Book and Special Collections Division at the Library of Congress
 22 Jacobus de Cessolis: De ludo scacchorum, incomplete at OPenn

1250 births
1322 deaths
13th-century Latin writers
Italian chess players
Italian chess writers
Italian Dominicans
Cessolis, Jacobus, de
People from the Province of Asti